JKX Oil & Gas plc is a British-based hydrocarbon exploration and production company, listed on the London Stock Exchange. JKX operates primarily in Russia and Ukraine, but has a presence in six other countries in Europe and North America. In June 2011, VTB Capital plc, a subsidiary of Russian state bank VTB, increased its share in JKX Oil & Gas to 6.4%. The deal makes VTB bank the fourth largest shareholder in the company. Ihor Kolomoyskyi, the co-owner of Privat Group, remains the largest shareholder in JKX with a 27.06% stake.

History
The Company was founded by John Patrick Kenny and Paul Davies as JP Kenny Exploration & Production Ltd in 1995 to search for oil and gas in the former Soviet Union.

In November 2021, the company announced its intention to buy in 23.3% of the company's shares and delist from the London Stock Exchange.

Operations

Ukraine and Russia
The company concentrates principally on projects in Ukraine and Russia. In the former, JKX is the dominant private enterprise in exploration and production, accounting for over three-quarters of all oil and almost half of all gas produced by non-state-owned companies. The firm has licence to operate in several mainly-onshore oil fields in the Poltava region. The company moved into Russia in 2007 with the $50 million purchase of Yuzhgazenergie, which holds the licence to exploit a gas field in the Koshekhablsky District in the south of the country.

Rest of the world
JKX also has investments in six other countries around the world: in Georgia it has a small stake in an exploration firm operated by Occidental Petroleum focusing on the Black Sea; while it holds minority interests in several onshore exploration licences in Turkey and eastern Bulgaria.

JKX also holds an interest in an oil field in Shelby County, Texas in the United States, a 50% stake in two exploration licences in northern Hungary  and bought into three licences in Slovakia in April 2008.

Reserves

See also 
 Eclairs Group Ltd v JKX Oil & Gas plc

References

External links

Companies based in the City of Westminster
Energy companies established in 1995
Oil and gas companies of the United Kingdom